The Württemberg T 6 was a German, 0-8-0T, goods train, tank locomotive operated by the Royal Württemberg State Railways.

The T 6 was specially procured for heavy shunting duties and was mainly used in the Stuttgart area. 

Locomotive number 1407 was handed over to the French Chemins de fer de l'État in 1919 and allocated number 40-903.
The Deutsche Reichsbahn took over the remaining eleven locomotives and grouped them into DRG Class 92.0 within their numbering plan. 
Already by 1945 a number of the locomotives had been sold to private railways. Only number 92 004 ended up in the  Deutsche Bundesbahn, who sold it too, in 1950, to a private railway.

See also
Royal Württemberg State Railways
List of Württemberg locomotives and railbuses

References

0-8-0T locomotives
T 6
Esslingen locomotives
Standard gauge locomotives of Germany
Railway locomotives introduced in 1916
D h2t locomotives

Freight locomotives